James Joseph Carlton  ,, was born on 13 May, 1935. He was an Australian businessman, politician, and humanitarian. He died on 24 December, 2015.

Early life
Carlton was born in Sydney and earned a Bachelor of Science from the University of Sydney.

Early career
Carlton’s political career began at the Sydney University Liberal Club, of which he later became president. He succeeded Sir John Carrick as General Secretary of the NSW Liberal Party during the McMahon – Snedden – Fraser periods.

Political career

Fraser Government (1977–83)
Carlton was elected to the Australian House of Representatives during the 1977 election for the seat of Mackellar and was Minister for Health from May 1982 to the defeat of the Fraser Government in March 1983.

Opposition (1983–94)
Carlton served on the Defence Sub-Committee of the Joint Committee on Foreign Affairs, Defence and Trade, and held a number of Shadow Ministry positions in Opposition, including Shadow Treasurer from 1985 to 1987 and Shadow Minister for Defence from 1989 to 1990.

In 1985, he stood for the Liberal Party leadership. He lost easily to John Howard.

He resigned from Parliament in January 1994.

Post Politics
From 1994 to 2001, Carlton was Secretary General of the Australian Red Cross, receiving the Red Cross Movement's highest honour, the Henry Dunant Medal. As a founder of the Crossroads Group together with John Hyde and Peter Shack he was influential in establishing the free-market or 'dry' cause in the Parliamentary wing of the Australian Liberal Party. He served on the boards of the PNG Sustainable Development Program and the Australia New Zealand School of Government. Additionally he was a Professional Fellow at the Centre for Public Policy at the University of Melbourne, and a Senior Adviser with the Boston Consulting Group, and was a council member of the Australian Strategic Policy Institute.

Honours

In January 2001, Carlton was awarded the Australian Centenary Medal; and in June that year, was appointed Officer of the Order of Australia (AO) for service to Australian society.

References

1935 births
2015 deaths
Members of the Australian House of Representatives for Mackellar
Members of the Australian House of Representatives
Liberal Party of Australia members of the Parliament of Australia
Red Cross personnel
Officers of the Order of Australia
Recipients of the Centenary Medal
University of Sydney alumni
20th-century Australian politicians
Australian Ministers for Health